Kartoffel (German for potato) is a derogatory slang term used by other cultures to describe Germans. It is also used in a humorous way and as a self-denomination.

History 
"Kartoffel" refers to a person of German descent, particularly an ethnic German from the perspective of allochthone populations in Germany. Use of the word Kartoffelfresser ("potato glutton") was popularised in the 1960s, when it was commonly used as a derogatory term to describe people of German descent. The first known use of the word in a similar sense was in 1873, when the Grimms' Deutsches Wörterbuch used it in a teasing manner to describe inhabitants of the Ore Mountains as Kartoffelwänste ("potato tummies"), because potatoes were the only substance that they ate, whether out of poverty, habit, or both.

Controversies 
The term "Kartoffel" has been used in debates about Germanophobia. In 2010, Kristina Schröder, the Minister for Family Affairs, stated in a television interview for the ARD that children were being described as "German potatoes" or "German sluts". She described such insults as a form of racism. Ehrhart Körting, the Berlin Senator of the Interior and Cem Özdemir, co-chair of the Alliance 90/The Greens party called for consistent action against such behavior, whilst the Alliance 90/The Greens politician Sven-Christian Kindler described Schröder's statements as "pseudo-scientific, dangerous nonsense".

German journalist Julian Reichelt was nominated for the Goldene Kartoffel ("golden potato") award in 2018 by the Neue deutsche Medienmacher ("New German Media Makers") association, for Bild-Zeitung on writing reports on the poor and immigration. Reichelt rejected the award, claiming that the term "Kartoffel" had evolved into a "racial insult on German school yards and is by no means well intentioned."

"Kartoffel" later appeared in public debate concerning Germany's national football team after they were knocked out of the 2018 FIFA World Cup in Russia. According to an article published in the German magazine Der Spiegel, the German football team was said to be segregated into self-appointed groups, Kanake (derogatory slang for "foreigner"), including international players Jérôme Boateng, Mesut Özil, and Julian Draxler, and Kartoffel, with "typical" Germans like Thomas Müller and Mats Hummels. The difference between these groups is mainly associated with the players' lifestyles: the more lavishly living Kanake group made fun of the lifestyle of the Kartoffeln. In response to news coverage of this, national players İlkay Gündoğan and Lukas Podolski, active players in the DFB until 2017, said that it was harmless teasing.

German satirist and late-night show host Jan Böhmermann described the authors of German Wikipedia as mainly white Germans with no immigration background in the episode Die Telelupe: Wikipedia on Neo Magazin Royale on April 18, 2019. He created the article Kartoffel (Slang) on German Wikipedia to see whether the material, which would offend this group of people, would remain on Wikipedia.

See also 

 Kraut, a derogatory term for Germans in English during the World Wars
 List of terms used for Germans
 List of ethnic slurs by ethnicity
 List of regional nicknames

References

Anti-German sentiment
Pejorative terms for European people